The Internet Service Providers Association (ISPA) is a Belgian trade association composed of access, hosting, service, and transit providers that advocates for the Internet sector in Belgium. The association currently consists of 25 members that have a public price list in Belgium for offering Internet or other IP services.

ISPA Belgium is the Belgian member of EuroISPA, a pan-European association of ISPAs.

Statistics 
Every quarter, ISPA publishes a quarterly market survey with statistics of residential and business connections in Belgium.

External links 
 Official site
 EuroISPA

Trade associations based in Belgium